The Famous Department Store (not to be confused with the "Famous Clothing Store", precursor to Famous-Barr and the May Department Stores Co.) was a department store in Los Angeles, California.

Famous had its origins with the Cal Hirsch & Sons Mercantile Co., founded in 1860 or 1871 depending on the source, which ran Army and Navy surplus stores in St. Louis.

After opening stores in Los Angeles starting in 1913 and later moved its headquarters there. The new Broadway store sold men's, women's and children's clothing, furnishings and accessories; shoes, drapes, furniture, drapes, household utensils and accessories and an entire floor was devoted to toys. It also has a beauty shop and lunch counter.

Morgan, Walls & Clements designed an art deco building for Famous on Pine Street in downtown Long Beach, which opened in 1929.

In 1950 the stores were sold to the J. J. Sugarman Co., a Los Angeles business investment firm, a value estimated at $3.5 million, reported by the Los Angeles Times as "one of the larges mercantile sales of its kind in recent years in California". The chain at that time consisted of eight stores: Advertising for the Famous Department Store ceases in 1952.

Stores 
Main store till 1939, then Famous Army and Navy store: 530 S. Main St., Los Angeles
Main store from 1939: 901 S. Broadway, Los Angeles
Long Beach, along shopping corridor Pine Avenue at 6th
Santa Ana, 4th and Bush
San Diego
Fullerton
Glendale, Brand at Harvard
Fresno
San Bernardino
Porterville

External links 
Blackstone Department Store Building (site of Famous Department Store), Los Angeles Conservancy
Google Street View of Long Beach store (art deco, 1929, Morgan, Walls & Clements)
"Famous Department Store, Long Beach, CA" in Pacific Coast Architecture Database

References 

Defunct department stores based in Greater Los Angeles
Art Deco architecture in California
Morgan, Walls & Clements buildings